"Living in a Moment" is a song written by Pat Bunch and Doug Johnson, and recorded by American country music artist Ty Herndon.  It was released in June 1996 as the first single and title track from his album of the same name.  In October of that year, it became his second Number One hit (see 1996 in country music).

Content
"Living in a Moment" is a moderate up-tempo country pop song in which the male narrator expresses his satisfaction with the lover he has found ("The world just lost two lonely people / The world just lost two broken hearts"). He elaborates on this point in the chorus by saying that he is "living in a moment [he] could die for".

Critical reception
Allmusic critic Thom Owens considered the track one of the stronger songs on the album.

Music video
The music video was directed by Steven Goldmann and premiered in mid-1996.  It was filmed in and around Sunset Station in San Antonio, Texas.  The video starred Ty Herndon and model/actress Donna W. Scott.

Chart positions
"Living in a Moment" debuted at number 56 on the U.S. Billboard Hot Country Singles & Tracks for the week of June 29, 1996.

Year-end charts

References

1996 singles
1996 songs
Ty Herndon songs
Music videos directed by Steven Goldmann
Epic Records singles
Songs written by Pat Bunch
Songs written by Doug Johnson (record producer)
Song recordings produced by Doug Johnson (record producer)